Douglas Ricardo Packer (born 13 March 1987), better known as Packer, is a Brazilian footballer who plays as a midfielder for Brazilian club Joinville.

Club career
Born in Indaial, Santa Catarina, Packer started his career at Ipatinga. He signed a professional contract on 1 August 2005, for three years.

On 31 August 2005, he was signed by Juventus, and loaned to A.C. Siena for two seasons. In summer 2007, Siena bought half of the player's rights, for €150,000, and loaned Packer to Pescara Calcio of Serie C1. He returned to Siena for the 2008–09 season.

He signed a five-year contract in summer 2009. In the same summer he left for Ravenna Calcio. In January 2011 Packer returned to Brazil for Paraná Clube in a temporary deal.

Honours
Ermis Aradippou
Cypriot Super Cup: 2014

Remo
Campeonato Paraense: 2019

References

External links
 

Living people
1987 births
Brazilian footballers
Brazilian expatriate footballers
Association football midfielders
Ipatinga Futebol Clube players
Paraná Clube players
Botafogo Futebol Clube (SP) players
Cuiabá Esporte Clube players
Juventus F.C. players
Delfino Pescara 1936 players
A.C.N. Siena 1904 players
Ravenna F.C. players
Treze Futebol Clube players
Clube do Remo players
Serie A players
Cypriot First Division players
Expatriate footballers in Italy
Brazilian people of German descent